Tamkuhi Road railway station is a second important railway station of Kushinagar district after Padrauna (District Headquarters, kushinagar) (popularly known for its international buddha pilgrimage) of Uttar Pradesh. Its code is TOI. It serves Tamkuhi Road town. The station consists of two platforms. The platforms are not well sheltered. It lacks many facilities including water and sanitation.

Tamkuhi Road was part of Bengal and North Western Railway constructed the -long -wide metre-gauge line from Siwan to Kaptanganj in 1907.

The Kaptanganj–Thawe section was converted to -wide  broad gauge in 2011. https://m.facebook.com/satya5108946/

References 

Varanasi railway division
Railway stations in Kushinagar district